Amman K. Arjunan is an Indian politician and businessman currently Member of the Legislative Assembly of Tamil Nadu from Coimbatore North state assembly constituency. Previously he won in Coimbatore South constituency in the fifteenth legislative assembly. He contested as All India Anna Dravida Munnetra Kazhagam candidate and won 2021 Tamil Nadu Legislative Assembly election by 4001 votes.

He is native of Coimbatore and has no academic degree.

Electoral performance

References

All India Anna Dravida Munnetra Kazhagam politicians
Living people
Year of birth missing (living people)
Tamil Nadu MLAs 2021–2026
Tamil Nadu MLAs 2016–2021